The 2022 Independence Bowl was a college football bowl game played on December 23, 2022, at Independence Stadium in Shreveport, Louisiana. The 46th annual Independence Bowl, it began at 2:04 p.m. CST and was aired on ESPN. The game featured the Louisiana Ragin' Cajuns from the Sun Belt Conference and the Houston Cougars from the American Athletic Conference. It was one of the 2022–23 bowl games concluding the 2022 FBS football season. Sponsored by engineering services company Radiance Technologies, the game was officially known as the Radiance Technologies Independence Bowl.

The game started quickly as Louisiana drove down the field on their first possession and scored a touchdown after 15 plays and nearly seven and a half minutes. Houston punted on their first drive and Louisiana did the same on their next possession. Houston failed to convert a 4th & 1 on their next drive and gave the ball back to Louisiana via a turnover on downs, and the Ragin' Cajuns turned that into a field goal to extend their lead to ten points. After a Houston three-and-out, Louisiana scored another field goal from an identical distance to their first, though Houston scored a touchdown on their final drive of the first half to narrow their deficit to seven points. Louisiana bumped it back up to ten with a field goal as time expired, and Houston cut it to three points after scoring a touchdown on their first drive of the second half. A fumble on Louisiana's second play gave the ball back to Houston, though they turned it over on downs again and Louisiana responded with a punt. Houston tied the ball game with a field goal on their ensuing drive and took the lead two drives later, after another Ragin' Cajuns fumble and a punt by both teams, with a 12-yard passing touchdown that left 20 seconds on the clock. Pressed for time, Louisiana threw an interception that ended the game, sealing a 23–16 comeback win for the Cougars.

Teams
The bowl has tie-ins with Conference USA and FBS independent Army. However, this year it featured the Louisiana Ragin' Cajuns from the Sun Belt Conference and the Houston Cougars from the American Athletic Conference (AAC or "The American"). Despite Army's 6–6 record, they were not bowl eligible due to two of their wins coming against Football Championship Subdivision (FCS) teams. This was the 10th meeting between Houston and Louisiana; the Cougars led the all-time series, 6–3, entering the game. The teams first met in 1946 and had most recently played on October 7, 2006, when Louisiana defeated Houston, 31–28.

Louisiana

The Ragin' Cajuns, from the Sun Belt Conference, ended the regular season with a record of 6–6 (4–4 in conference play). Their coach was Michael Desormeaux, in his first year. This was the tenth bowl game appearance for Louisiana; they had a 7–2 record in prior games but an official record of 5–2 after two of their victories were vacated. Their last bowl game was the 2021 New Orleans Bowl, which they won; this was their first Independence Bowl appearance.

Louisiana's defense entered the game having been a bright spot for the team during the season, as they ranked in the top 25 nationally in turnover margin. On offense, Louisiana was without quarterback Ben Wooldridge due to an injury, while wide receiver Michael Jefferson and defensive end Andrew Jones opted out due to draft preparation.

Houston

The Cougars, a member of the American Athletic Conference, finished the regular season with a record of 7–5 (5–3 in conference play). The Cougars were led by fourth-year head coach Dana Holgorsen. The Cougars made their 30th all-time bowl game appearance, and they entered with a 12–16–1 record in prior bowl games having last played in the 2021 Birmingham Bowl. This was the Cougars' first Independence Bowl appearance. This was Houston's final game as a member of the American Athletic Conference, as the Cougars are set to join the Big 12 Conference in 2023.

The Houston offense was led by quarterback Clayton Tune, who entered the game with the AAC record for career touchdown passes with 101 and needed two touchdown passes in the game to pass Tanner Mordecai for the AAC single-season record. Tune had wide receiver Nathaniel Dell for the game, despite Dell's declaration for the NFL Draft. The Houston defense, in contrast, did not enter the game as strongly, as they ranked No. 110 nationally in scoring defense and were generally regarded as the team's weakest aspect.

Holgorsen wore a black hoodie with "STATE" on the front as an homage to his late mentor and coach Mike Leach, who died on December 12, 2022. Holgorsen played for Leach at Iowa Wesleyan University and was a part of Leach's coaching staff at Texas Tech; at the time of his death, Leach was the head coach at Mississippi State.

Game summary
The Independence Bowl was televised by ESPN, with a commentary team of Dave Neal, Deuce McAllister, and Harry Lyles Jr. The game's officiating crew, representing Conference USA, was led by referee Scott Hardin and umpire Antonio Barrial.

First half

The game began at 2:05 p.m. CST with the opening kickoff by Kyle Ramsey. Louisiana's opening drive was a long one, as they drove 75 yards in 15 plays, converting two third downs and a fourth down along the way. After nearly seven and a half minutes, the Ragin' Cajuns found the end zone as quarterback Chandler Fields passed to wide receiver Johnny Lumpkin for a 4-yard touchdown for the game's first points. Houston faced a 4th & 1 early into their opening drive and converted it, though their next series ended in a fourth-and-long and the Cougars punted. Louisiana punted for the first time on their next drive, though the kick went only 19 yards and was downed at the Houston 48-yard-line. Houston faced 3rd & 6 early in their next drive, and converted, before a 4-yard rush by Brandon Campbell ended the quarter.

Clayton Tune was sacked on the first play of the second quarter and two plays later, Houston failed to convert 4th & 1 and turned the ball over on downs to the Ragin' Cajuns. Several completions by Fields and a long rush by Dre'lyn Washington set up a 42-yard field goal attempt for placekicker Kenneth Almendares, which he made to increase Louisiana's lead to ten points. Houston went three-and-out for the first time on their next drive, and the ensuing punt return was returned by Eric Garror to the Houston 27-yard-line. Louisiana's offense was unable to produce much but the Ragin' Cajuns were able to attempt another 42-yard field goal due to their good starting field position. Almendares made this kick too, increasing Louisiana's lead to 13 points. Houston scored for the first time on their next drive, as they drove 80 yards in nine plays and converted a 4th & 2 just past midfield along the way. Their scoring play was a 33-yard completion from Tune to KeSean Carter. Louisiana's final possession of the half was a long 14-play drive that began at their own 12-yard-line and reached the Houston 6-yard-line with 2 seconds remaining, at which point they successfully attempted a 22-yard field goal and entered halftime with a ten-point lead.

Second half

The second half began much like the first with a long drive that ended with a touchdown, though this one was for Houston rather than Louisiana. The Cougars started at their own 30-yard-line and crossed midfield in four plays, after which they ran nine more before reaching the end zone with a 2-yard pass from Tune to Nathaniel Dell. Louisiana gave the ball right back with a fumble on their second play of the quarter, and Houston recovered at the Louisiana 36-yard-line. They were unable to capitalize as they failed to convert 4th & 1 from the Louisiana 5-yard-line, resulting in a turnover on downs. Louisiana gained a first down on their first play but stalled from there as they punted several plays later and gave Houston the ball back at the Louisiana 33-yard-line following the return by Peyton Sawyer. Houston gained several first downs and reached the Louisiana 9-yard-line before a sack by Ja'Marian Peterson and Jourdan Quibodeaux ended the third quarter.

Houston advanced to the Louisiana 2-yard-line but stalled from there and converted a 19-yard field goal to tie the game at 16 points apiece. The Ragin' Cajuns reached the Houston 9-yard-line on their next possession following a 25-yard rush by backup quarterback Zeon Chriss, who entered in place of the injured starter Fields, but fumbled on the next play, and the ball was recovered by Houston's Donavan Mutin. The Cougars went three-and-out and punted from their own 23-yard-line, and Louisiana punted the ball back to Houston after a 5-play drive that gained 11 yards in total. Houston's first play after regaining possession was a 33-yard rush by Tune that reached the Houston 41-yard-line, though a holding penalty set them back ten yards on the next play. A 41-yard pass to KeSean Carter moved the ball into Louisiana territory on the next play, and a rush by Ta'Zhawn Henry on the next play gained 11 yards and another first down. After Tune rushed for 15 yards to advance to the Louisiana 12-yard-line, he completed a pass to Dell for a touchdown to take a seven-point lead with 20 seconds left in the game. Louisiana suffered a sack fumble that they recovered before Chriss threw an interception at their own 45-yard-line. Houston took a knee on their next play, the final snap of the game, to close out a 23–16 win. The game ended at 5:40 p.m. after a total duration of three hours and 36 minutes.

Scoring summary

Statistics

References

Independence Bowl
Independence Bowl
Independence Bowl
Independence Bowl
Houston Cougars football bowl games
Louisiana Ragin' Cajuns football bowl games